Semenivka is the name of various locations in Ukraine:
 Semenivka, Chernihiv Oblast, a city in the Chernihiv Oblast
 Semenivka, Poltava Oblast, an urban-type settlement in the Poltava Oblast
 Semenivka, a village and suburb of Kramatorsk in the Donetsk Oblast
 Seminivka, a river in Khmelnytskyi Oblast, right tributary of Poltva